The Piratas de La Guaira are a professional basketball team based in Maiquetía, Vargas, Venezuela. Founded in 2008, from 2010 to 2022, they were known as the Bucaneros de La Guaira. The team was re-founded as the Piratas in 2022. The team currently plays in the Superliga Profesional de Baloncesto, the top division of the Venezuelan basketball pyramid. The club also has a women's basketball team, volleyball and futsal teams.

Current roster

Notable alumni

Players
To appear in this section a player must have either:
- Set a club record or won an individual award as a professional player.
- Played at least one official international match for his senior national team at any time.

Coaches
To appear in this section a player must have either:
- Set a club record or won an individual award as a professional coach.
- Coached at least one official international match for a senior national team at any time.

References

External links
Official website
Instagram profile
Team Profile at Latinbasket.com

Basketball teams established in 2009
Basketball teams in Venezuela
La Guaira